USS Zephyr (PC-8) is a  patrol coastal ship in the United States Navy.

Zephyr is the eighth ship of thirteen in the Cyclone class. All ships in this class are named after weather elements. Zephyr is the first Navy vessel to bear the name. She was laid down 6 March 1993, by Bollinger Shipyards, Lockport, Louisiana and launched 3 December 1993. She was commissioned on 14 October 1994 and decommissioned 1 October 2004 and transferred to the United States Coast Guard as USCGC Zephyr (WPC-8).

Zephyr was the first Coast Guard cutter deployed to respond to the Deepwater Horizon oil rig fire.

Zephyr was transferred back to the Navy on 30 September 2011, and is once again designated PC-8.

Zephyr was decommissioned on 17 February 2021.

References

External links
  navsource.org: USCGC Zephyr (WPC-8)
 Federation of American Scientists, Cyclone class ship characteristics

 

Patrol vessels of the United States
Cyclone-class patrol ships
Ships of the United States Coast Guard
Ships built in Lockport, Louisiana
1993 ships
Ships transferred from the United States Navy to the United States Coast Guard